Talcher (Sl. No.: 60) is a Vidhan Sabha constituency of the town Talcher in Angul district, Odisha.

This constituency includes Talcher, Talcher block and 7 GPs (Kaniha, Kamarei, Badatribida, Santribida, Bijigol, Badagunduri and Jarada) of Kaniha block.

In 2009 election, Independent candidate Braja Kishore Pradhan defeated Biju Janata Dal candidate Mahesh Sahoo by a margin of 8,642 votes.

Elected Members

Fifteen elections were held between 1951 and 2014. Elected members from the Talcher constituency are:
 2019: (60): Braja Kishore Pradhan (Biju Janata Dal)
 2014: (60): Braja Kishore Pradhan (Biju Janata Dal)
 2009: (60): Braja Kishore Pradhan (Independent)
2004: (122): Mahesh Sahoo (BJP)
2000: (122): Mahesh Sahoo (BJP)
1995: (122): Mahesh Sahoo (BJP)
1990: (122): Brundaban Behera (Independent)
1985: (122): Bhajaman Behera (Congress)
1980: (122): Brundaban Behera (JNP-JP)
1977: (122): Brundaban Behera (Janata Party)
1974: (122): Brundaban Behera (Orissa Jana Congress)
1971: (137): Brundaban Behera (Orissa Jana Congress )
1967: (137): Kumar Chandra Behera (Orissa Jana Congress )
1961: (74):  Pabitra Mohan Pradhan (Congress)
1957: (50): Pabitra Mohan Pradhan (Congress)
1951: (15): Pabitra Mohan Pradhan (Congress)

Election results

2019

2014
In 2014 election, Biju Janata Dal candidate Brajakishore Pradhan defeated Bharatiya Janata Party candidate Kalandi Samal by a margin of 14,322 votes.

2009

Notes

References

Assembly constituencies of Odisha
Politics of Angul district
Dhenkanal district